Diller Scofidio + Renfro is an American interdisciplinary design studio that integrates architecture, the visual arts, and the performing arts. Based in New York City, Diller Scofidio + Renfro is led by four partners – Elizabeth Diller, Ricardo Scofidio, Charles Renfro, and Benjamin Gilmartin – who work with a staff of architects, artists, designers, and researchers.

Biography
The studio was founded by Elizabeth Diller and Ricardo Scofidio in 1981; Charles Renfro joined in 1997 and became partner in 2004. Benjamin Gilmartin became a partner in 2015. Elizabeth Diller attended The Cooper Union School of Art and received a Bachelor of Architecture degree from the Cooper Union School of Architecture. She is a Professor of Architecture at Princeton University School of Architecture and a visiting professor at the Bartlett School of Architecture. In 2009, Diller was selected by Time magazine as one of the "100 Most Influential People in the World". Ricardo Scofidio attended The Cooper Union School of Architecture and received a Master of Architecture degree from Columbia University. Scofidio is Professor Emeritus of Architecture at Cooper Union. Charles Renfro attended Rice University and received a Master of Science in Advanced Architectural Design degree from Columbia University Graduate School of Architecture, Planning and Preservation. Renfro has served as visiting professor at Rice University and Columbia University, among others.

From 1999-2004 the MacArthur Foundation honored the firm's work with the 'genius' award, stating that they "have created an alternative form of architectural practice that unites design, performance, and electronic media with cultural and architectural theory and criticism. Their work explores how space functions in our culture and illustrates that architecture, when understood as the physical manifestation of social relationships, is everywhere, not just in buildings."

Work
Diller Scofidio + Renfro's international body of completed architectural work includes the Lincoln Center for the Performing Arts Redevelopment in New York (including the redesign of Alice Tully Hall), the renovation and expansion of the Juilliard School, the Hypar Pavilion Lawn and Restaurant, the expansion of the School of American Ballet, renovations to the New York State Theater lobby, the canopy entry to Fashion Week at Lincoln Center, public spaces throughout the campus, Information Landscape, and the President's Bridge.

Selected work
 Blur, a pavilion built of fog on Lake Neuchâtel and commissioned by the Swiss Expo.02, (2002)
 Slither, a housing complex in Gifu, Japan (2003)
 Institute of Contemporary Art, the first new museum to be built in Boston in 100 years (2006)
 Perry and Marty Granoff Center for the Creative Arts for Brown University in Providence, Rhode Island (2011)
 The Shed, a cultural center in Hudson Yards, New York, New York (2019)

Projects in construction or in design include:
 the Museum of Modern Art (MoMA) Expansion in New York City;
 The Broad, a major modern art museum in Los Angeles; 
 Berkeley Art Museum and Pacific Film Archive at the University of California, Berkeley; 
 Columbia University Medical Center Education Building and Columbia Business School in New York City; the Museum of Image & Sound on Copacabana Beach in Rio de Janeiro; 
 Stanford University Art & Art History Building;
  D Tower ("The Corset") at 15 Hudson Yards, residential tower  for Related Companies, part of the Hudson Yards Redevelopment Project in New York City

In 2013 Diller Scofidio + Renfro won the international design competition for Zaryadye Park, a new 35-acre public space next to the Kremlin in Moscow, Russia.

Installation and performance projects
Installation and performance projects recently completed include: The Art of Scent 1889-2010, an exhibition of olfactory art at the Museum of Arts and Design; Open House, an installation in Levittown in collaboration with Droog; How Wine Became Modern for SFMOMA; Be Your Self with the Australian Dance Theatre; the Exit (Terre Natale) exhibition for the Fondation Cartier, also presented at the United Nations Conference on Climate Change (COP15) in Copenhagen; Traveling Music for Evento 2009 in Bordeaux; Chain City for the 2008 Venice Biennale 11th International Architecture Exhibition; Arbores Laetae for the 2008 Liverpool Biennial; Does the Punishment Fit the Crime? for the Fondazione Sandretto Re Rebaudengo Turin; and Action Painting for the Beyeler Museum in Basel.

Gallery

Awards
In 1999, the MacArthur Foundation presented Elizabeth Diller and Ricardo Scofidio with Fellowships for their commitment to integrating architecture with issues of contemporary culture. They were recently made fellows of the Royal Institute of British Architects and were inducted into the American Academy of Arts and Sciences. In 2012, Elizabeth Diller was elected into the American Academy of Arts and Letters and selected as an Aspen Institute Harman-Eisner Artist in Residence. In 2013, she was honored with the Barnard Medal of Distinction.

Other prestigious awards and honors received by Diller Scofidio + Renfro include: the National Design Award from the Smithsonian; the Brunner Prize from the American Academy of Arts and Letters; an Obie for an off-Broadway theater production; the Centennial Medal of Honor from American Academy in Rome; the AIA President's Award; the AIA Medal of Honor; and AIA Design Awards for numerous projects. In 2003, the Whitney Museum of American Art held a retrospective of the studio's work, recognizing the firm's unorthodox practice. In 2009, Elizabeth Diller and Ricardo Scofidio were named among Time magazine's 100 Most Influential People in the World and the partners were featured in a one-hour segment with Charlie Rose. In 2010, Fast Company named Diller Scofidio + Renfro the most innovative design practice in the profession and among the 50 most innovative companies in the world.

Publications
Books by Diller Scofidio + Renfro include Bodybuildings: Architectural Facts and Fictions; Back to the Front: Tourisms of War; Flesh: architectural probes; and Blur: the Making of Nothing. The studio's most recent book, Lincoln Center Inside Out: An Architectural Account, chronicles a decade of work redesigning a New York City icon. Diller Scofidio + Renfro is the subject of Scanning: The Aberrant Architectures of Diller + Scofidio, published by the Whitney Museum and including essays by Aaron Betsky, K. Michael Hays and Laurie Anderson; the monograph Diller + Scofidio (+Renfro): The Ciliary Function by Guido Incerti, Daria Ricchi and Deane Simpson; and Diller Scofidio + Renfro: Architecture After Images  by Edward Dimendberg

Selected projects
Architecture:
 Slow House, unbuilt (1991)
 Brasserie Restaurant, Seagram Building, New York, NY (2000)
 World Trade Center Viewing Platform, New York, NY (2001)
 Blur, Swiss Expo, Lake Neuchâtel (2002)
 Slither, Gifu, Japan (2003)
 Eyebeam Museum of Art and Technology, New York, NY (unbuilt, 2004)
 Institute of Contemporary Art, Boston, MA (2006)
 School of American Ballet, Expansion, New York, NY (2007)
 Alice Tully Hall, Redesign, New York, NY (2009)
 The Juilliard School, Renovation and Expansion, New York, NY (2009)
 New York State Theater, Lobby Renovation, New York, NY (2010)
 Lincoln Center Public Spaces, New York, NY (2010)
 Hypar Pavilion Lawn and Restaurant, New York, NY (2011)
 Perry and Marty Granoff Center for the Creative Arts, Brown University, Providence RI (2011)
 President's Bridge, Lincoln Center, New York, NY (2012)
 Hirshhorn Museum & Sculpture Garden Seasonal Inflatable Pavilion, Washington DC (unbuilt, 2012)
 High Line, New York, NY, Phases 1, 2, 3 (2009, 2011, 2014)
 The Broad, Los Angeles, CA 
 Berkeley Art Museum and Pacific Film Archive, University of California, Berkeley, CA
 Museum of Image & Sound, Rio de Janeiro, Brazil (in construction)
 Columbia Business School, New York, NY (in design)
 Columbia University Medical Center Education Building, New York, NY (in construction)
 The Shed, Hudson Yards, New York, NY (2019)
15 Hudson Yards, Hudson Yards, New York, NY (2019)
 Museum of Modern Art Expansion, New York, NY (in design)
 McMurtry Building, Stanford University, Palo Alto, CA
 Zaryadye Park, Moscow, Russia (2017)
David M. Rubenstein Forum, University of Chicago, Chicago, IL
Tianjin Juilliard School, Tianjin, China

Installation and curatorial:
 Traffic, Columbus Circle, New York, NY (1981)
 Memory Theatre, Brooklyn Bridge Anchorage, Brooklyn, NY (1987)
 Para-Site, MoMA, New York, NY (1989)
 Tourisms:suitCase Studies", Walker Art Center, Minneapolis, MN (1991)
 Bad Press, SFMOMA, San Francisco, CA (1993)
 Soft Sell, Times Square, New York, NY (1993)
 Vice / Virtue, Glassmanifest, Leerdam, the Netherlands (1997)
 American Lawn, Canadian Centre for Architecture, Montreal, Canada (1998)
 Master/Slave, Fondation Cartier, Paris, France (1999)
 Travelogues, John F. Kennedy International Airport, Queens, NY (2001)
 Mural, Whitney Museum, New York, NY (2003)
 Facsimile, Moscone Convention Center, San Francisco CA (2004)
 Does the Punishment Fit the Crime?, Fondazione Sandretto Re Rebaudengo Turin, Italy (2008)
 Action Painting, Beyeler Foundation, Basel, Switzerland (2008)
 Light Sock, commissioned by Swarovski (2009)
 Chain City, Venice Biennale 11th International Architecture Exhibition, Venice, Italy (2008)
 Arbores Laetae, Liverpool Biennial, Liverpool, UK (2008)
 Exit, Fondation Cartier, Paris, France (2009)
 Drill Baby Drill, MAXXI, Rome, Italy (2010)
 Fashion Week, Canopy Entry at Lincoln Center, New York, NY (2010)
 Open House, in collaboration with Droog, Levittown, NY (2011)
 How Wine Became Modern, SFMOMA, San Francisco CA (2011)
 The Art of Scent: 1889-2010, Museum of Arts and Design, New York, NY (2012-2013)

Performance:
 Moving Target, Charleroi, Belgium (1996)
 EJM I and II, Performed Internationally (1998)
 Jet Lag, Multimedia Theater Work, Premiered in New York, NY (1998)
 Who's Your DADA?, MoMA, New York, NY (2006)
 Traveling Music, Evento 2009, Bordeaux, France (2009)
 Be Your Self, in collaboration with Australian Dance Theatre, Adelaide, Australia (2010)

References

Documentaries
 Diller Scofidio + Renfro, Reimagining Lincoln Center and the High Line (dir. Muffie Dunn and Tom Piper, 2012, 54 minutes)

External links
 
 Gardner, Ralph. "From Designer's Pen to the Plaza at Lincoln Center". The Wall Street Journal. 2 July 2013.
 Øye, Victoria Bugge. "Diller Scofidio + Renfro: Masters of Space, Viewed through the Rear View Mirror". Los Angeles Review of Books. 22 June 2013.
 Kennicott, Philip. "With Hirshhorn Bubble, Smithsonian Could Break D.C. from Stagnation". The Washington Post. 17 May 2013.
 Moore, Rowan. "Liz Diller: 'We thought we would have been fired a long time ago'". The Guardian. 29 December 2012.
 Filler, Martin. "The City's Their Stage". New York Review of Books. 27 September 2012.
 Goldberger, Paul. "New York's High Line: Miracle Above Manhattan". National Geographic. April 2011.
 Davidson, Justin. "The Illusionists". The New Yorker. 14 May 2007.

 
MacArthur Fellows
Architecture firms based in New York City